Wildenstein Castle is a castle in the municipality of Bubendorf in the canton of Basel-Land in Switzerland.  It is a Swiss heritage site of national significance.

The castle was acquired by the local council in 1995 and is now regularly used for cultural events.

See also 
 List of castles in Switzerland

References

External links 
 

Cultural property of national significance in Basel-Landschaft
Castles in Basel-Landschaft